Chaima Trabelsi (born March 11, 1982) is a Tunisian racewalker. She competes in the 20 kilometres race walk.

At both the 2007 and the 2011 All-Africa Games, Trabelsi won a gold medal in 20 km walk event.

Competition record

References

1982 births
Living people
Tunisian female racewalkers
World Athletics Championships athletes for Tunisia
African Games gold medalists for Tunisia
African Games medalists in athletics (track and field)
Athletes (track and field) at the 2007 All-Africa Games
Athletes (track and field) at the 2011 All-Africa Games
20th-century Tunisian women
21st-century Tunisian women